Christelle Dubos (born 26 March 1976) is a French politician of La République En Marche! (LREM) who was elected to the French National Assembly from 2017 to 2022, representing the department of Gironde.

Early life and education
Dubos is the daughter of an engineer and a seamstress. She is the mother of two children.

Professional career
Holder of a diploma of social worker, Dubos practiced between 1998 and 2007, before participating in the setting up of the Intercommunal Center of Social Action in the community of communes of Créonnais. Until her election in June 2017, she was Director of Solidarity and Employment at the community of Montesquieu.

Political career
Dubos began her political career a councillor of Sadirac, responsible for social affairs, housing and solidarity in April 2014.

Not affiliated with a political party until then, Dubos joined the movement En Marche, which she believes "share the values" in December 2016.

Member of the National Assembly
On May 11, 2017, Dubos was chosen by La République En Marche! to be the party's candidate in the 12th constituency of the Gironde. She won on June 18, 2017 with 56.71% of the vote ahead of Christophe Miqueu, candidate of La France Insoumise. She succeeded Martine Faure, who decided not to run again.

In parliament, Dubos served on the Committee on Economic Affairs. In this capacity, she was particularly committed to territorial cohesion, housing and professional integration. She was also a co-rapporteur on the evolution of housing, planning and digital technology (ELAN Law), particularly on the aspects related to housing and social mix

Member of the Government
From 2018 until 2020, Dubos served as Secretary of State to the Minister of Solidarities and Health in the government of Prime Minister Édouard Philippe, serving under the leadership of the successive Ministers of Solidarities and Health Agnès Buzyn and Olivier Véran. In that capacity, she oversaw the ministry’s activities on the fight against poverty, family policies and access to care for the poor.

References

1976 births
Living people
Women government ministers of France
Deputies of the 15th National Assembly of the French Fifth Republic
Women members of the National Assembly (France)
La République En Marche! politicians
21st-century French women politicians